Kasey Beirnes (born June 17, 1980 in Elora, Ontario) is a Canadian former professional lacrosse player in the National Lacrosse League. He was drafted in the third round, the 28th overall pick, by the Columbus Landsharks. He retired after 16 seasons. He played for the Columbus Landsharks, Arizona Sting, Minnesota Swarm and Toronto Rock.

Early years
Beirnes was born on June 17, 1980 in Elora, Ontario. He grew up playing baseball and hockey until he was about 12, when he fell in love with lacrosse. He attended Fanshawe College.

Professional career

NLL
Beirnes was drafted 28th overall by the Columbus Landsharks. As a rookie, Beirnes made the 2002 National Lacrosse League all-rookie team as a member of the Landsharks. In 2003, Beirnes had his most career assists with 35. After the 2004 season, the Landsharks moved to Arizona and become the Arizona Sting. He had his most career points that year with 62. On June 23, 2005, Beirnes and Darryl Gibson were traded to the Minnesota Swarm in exchange for two first round draft picks.  In 2006, Beirnes led the Swarm in goals with 24. Beirnes was traded from the Swarm to the Toronto Rock in exchange for two picks during the 2008 draft. During the 2010 Champions Cup, Beirnes scored four goals. In 2011, Beirnes was a member of the Champions Cup winning Rock. He had 2 goals and 2 assists in the game. In 2015, Beirnes had his most career goals with 35. He retired in 2017 after 16 seasons in the NLL.

Not NLL
While with the Wellington Aces, Beirnes won the Presidents Cup. In 2013 and 2014, Beirnes was a member of the Six Nations Chiefs, who won the Mann Cup.

Statistics

NLL
Reference:

References

1980 births
Living people
Lacrosse forwards
Arizona Sting players
Canadian expatriate lacrosse people in the United States
Canadian lacrosse players
Lacrosse people from Ontario
Minnesota Swarm players
People from Centre Wellington
Toronto Rock players